The worldwide total cumulative installed electricity generation capacity from wind power has increased rapidly since the start of the third millennium, and as of the end of 2020, it amounts to 733 GW. Since 2010, more than half of all new wind power was added outside the traditional markets of Europe and North America, mainly driven by the continuing boom in China and India. At the end of 2015, China had 145 GW of wind power installed. In 2015, China installed close to half the world's added wind power capacity.

Wind power is used on a commercial basis in more than half of all the countries of the world.

By 2020, 56% wind power penetration was achieved in Denmark, 40% in Uruguay, 36% in Lithuania, 35% in Ireland, 24% in the UK, 23% in Portugal and in Germany, 20% in Spain, 18% in Greece, 16% in Sweden, 15% (avg) in the EU, 8% in the US, and 6% in China.

In November 2018, wind power generation in Scotland was higher than the country's electricity consumption during the month. Wind power's share of worldwide electricity usage at the end of 2018 was 4.8%, up from 3.1% four years earlier. In Europe, its share of power generation capacity was 18.8% in 2018. In 2018, upcoming wind power markets rose from 8% to 10% across the Middle East, Latin America, South East Asia, and Africa.

Installed capacity 
This section provides end-of-year figures of worldwide installed wind power capacity by country, including both onshore and offshore. The data is sourced from Global Wind Energy Council. In 2018, global wind power capacity increased by 51 GW to 591 GW, an increase of 9.6% compared to the end of 2017.

List by country

Historical data (2004-2013)

Electricity generation

See also

References

 
Renewable energy